Meidoun  (ميدون) is a village in the West Beqaa District in southern Lebanon. Following the 1982 invasion it was just North of the Israeli security zone. In the late 1980s it had become a Hizbullah stronghold.

History
On 4 May 1988 the Israeli army launched a 48-hour offensive against Meidoun. UNIFIL estimated that the invading force involved 1,500 soldiers with a dozen tanks, armoured vehicles and Cobra helecopters and that the village was bombarded overnight with over 1000 shells. After several hours of fighting the army blew up the fifty houses that the village consisted of. Over the following days the SLA used bulldozers to demolish the ruins. After the raid Israeli statements claimed 40-50 Hizbullah fighters had been killed. Three Israeli soldiers were killed and seventeen wounded. One of the Israeli fatalities was a result of Lebanese Army artillery fire.

References

External links
Maydoun - Loussia, localiban

Populated places in Western Beqaa District
Shia Muslim communities in Lebanon